Bejoy Nambiar (born 12 April 1979) is an Indian film director, and screenwriter known for his work in Bollywood. He is mostly known for his critically acclaimed short films, Rahu and Reflections, starring Mohanlal. He was the winner of Sony PIX Gateway to Hollywood, as the best director judged by Ashok Amritraj, Rajat Kapoor and Anurag Basu. He marked his feature film debut with the thriller Shaitan (2011). His second feature film was a anthology-drama film called David. His latest Bollywood film was Taish (2020) which was also released as a Series on ZEE5. He also directed Wazir (2016), starring Amitabh Bachchan and Farhan Akhtar. He has also directed a short video 'Sachinocalypse' for All India Bakchod.

Personal life
His mother tongue is Malayalam. Nambiar was married to Juhi Babbar on 27 June 2007, after a two-year courtship; the couple divorced in January 2009. He then married his long-time girlfriend Sheetal Menon in a traditional Malayali wedding in Kerala on 27 December 2015.

Filmography

Awards and nominations

Notes

References

External links 
 

Living people
Film directors from Kerala
Tamil film directors
Hindi-language film directors
1979 births
Film producers from Kerala
Artists from Kannur
Screenwriters from Kerala
Hindi screenwriters
21st-century Indian film directors